Gabbiella rosea is a species of small freshwater snails with an operculum, aquatic prosobranch gastropod mollusks in the family Bithyniidae.

This species is endemic to Kenya. Its natural habitat is freshwater lakes.

References

Bithyniidae
Freshwater snails of Africa
Endemic molluscs of Kenya
Gastropods described in 1968
Taxonomy articles created by Polbot